Steve Gaw (born July 7, 1957) is Democratic Party politician who served as Speaker of the Missouri House of Representatives.

Personal information
Gaw grew up in Moberly, Missouri where he graduated from high school in 1974.  He received a bachelor's degree from Truman State University in 1978, where he majored in physics.  He received a Juris Doctor degree from the University of Missouri in 1981. He is married to Fannie Bowdish Gaw.

Professional Experience
Steve Gaw has had the following professional experience:
Law Offices of Schirmer, Suter, and Gaw, Partner
Formerly served as a city attorney

Organizations
Steve Gaw has been a member of the following organizations:
American Saddle Horse Association
Moberly Area Chamber of Commerce, Board of Directors
Governmental Affairs Council, former Vice-President
American Horse Show Association
Moberly Rotary Club
American Diabetes Society, Moberly Chapter former Board Member
Missouri Bar
KIDS COUNT Advisory Committee
Westsiders Gospel Quartet
National Guard Association, 'Charles Dick Medal of Merit,' 1995
Missouri Bar Association, 'Award for Legislative Service,' 1995

Politics
He was elected to the Missouri House of Representatives representing Moberly in 1992 and was Speaker from 1996 to 2000. In 2000 he lost to Matt Blunt in a bid for the position of Missouri Secretary of State. He was on the Missouri Public Service Commission from 2001 to 2007, serving as chairman from 2003 to 2005. In 2008 he lost a primary bid for the Ninth U.S. Congressional District.

Political Experience
Steve Gaw has had the following political experience:
Candidate, United States House of Representatives, District 9, 2008
Candidate, Secretary of State, Missouri, 2000
Missouri Democratic Party
Speaker of the House, Missouri

References

1957 births
People from Moberly, Missouri
Speakers of the Missouri House of Representatives
Democratic Party members of the Missouri House of Representatives
Truman State University alumni
University of Missouri alumni
Living people
20th-century American politicians